Jean-Marie Poiré (born 10 July 1945) is a French film director, and screenwriter. He is the son of the producer Alain Poiré.

Filmography

As director
 Les petits câlins (The Little Wheedlers) (1978)
 Retour en force (Return in Bond) (1980)
 Les Hommes préfèrent les grosses (Men Prefer Fat Girls) (1981)
 Le Père Noël est une ordure (1982)
 Papy fait de la résistance (1983)
 Twist again à Moscou (Twist Again in Moscow) (1986)
 Mes meilleurs copains (1989)
 L'Opération Corned-Beef (1991)
 Les Visiteurs (The Visitors) (1993)
 Les Anges gardiens (Guardian Angels) (1995)
 Les Visiteurs II: Les Couloirs du temps (The Visitors II: The Corridors of Time) (1998)
 Just Visiting (2001) (as Jean-Marie Gaubert)
 Ma femme... s'appelle Maurice (My Wife Maurice aka. My Wife's Name Is Maurice) (2002)
 The Visitors: Bastille Day (2016)

As screenwriter
Leontine  (1968)
 A Golden Widow (1969)
 Monsieur Papa (1977)

References

External links

1945 births
Living people
Film directors from Paris
French screenwriters
French film producers